Nayagaon is a semi-urban area in Sonpur Block in Saran in Bihar, India. Nayagaon is part of Sonpur (Vidhan Sabha constituency) and Saran (Lok Sabha constituency). New townships are being built in Nayagaon, N G Town by Phenomenal Projects Pvt., The Sai Green Mega Township Project by TCW (The Corporate World) Realty under Greater Patna Project, Natural City by Bold India Infra Private Limited Devkripa Green city Shital Green City Project Of Shital Buildtech Pvt Ltd, Kazari infra tech pvt ltd, Rav Residency and Aryavart Group. The distance of Nayagaon to Patna(Patliputra) has been reduced from earlier 45 km to 15 km due to Digha–Sonpur rail–road bridge. Nayagaon is located on NH 19, Nayagaon Sarai. Nayagaon is located at Mouza/Mauja Rasulpur. It is located along river Ganges. It is also near the under construction Hajipur-Chhapra-Ghazipur four-lane Highway (NH 31). The distance to AIIMS Patna in Phulwari Sharif is also reduced due to Digha-AIIMS elevated highway (Patli Path). Census code of Nayagaon is 234491. A power sub-station became functional in Nayagaon under Deen Dayal Upadhyaya Gram Jyoti Yojana in August 2020. An ITI (Industrial training institute) is also planned in Nayagaon. Nayagaon is 12 km from Rail Wheel Plant, Bela, Dariapur Block in Saran. A stadium is being constructed at the cost of Rs 55 lakhs in the sports ground of Gogal Singh Intermediate College, Nayagaon. An inter-modal terminal at Kalughat, Nayagaon is being constructed as part of National Waterway 1 under the government's Jal Marg Vikas project.

Nayagaon railway station

Nayagaon falls under the jurisdiction of Sonpur railway division. Route between Nayagaon and Digha Bridge Halt: pathGoogle location

Important landmarks

Nayagaon has a good market.
 State Bank of India, Nayagaon Branch (004862), Saran, Bihar – IFSC Code-SBIN0004862
 Gogal Singh Intermediate College , Nayagaon
 Kasturba Gandhi Balika Vidyalaya (KGBV), Nayagaon
 Sant Ravidas Bhavan
 Kaalratri Temple, Dumri Buzurg, Nayagaon.
 St. Kevin's Academy, Nayagaon
 Raghubir Singh High School, Mahadalichak, Nayagaon
 Devki Nand senior secondary school Nayagaon
 Upgraded Middle School (Ums) Baherwa Gachi School, Nayagaon.
 SAHID RAJENDRA DWAR

Demographics
The population of Nayagaon is 8,575 as per 2011 census.  The sex ratio is 924 females per 1000 males. Area of Nayagaon is 209 hectares.

Nayagaon Panchayat

Panchayat Elections in Sonepur were held in June 2016.

Nayagaon Police Station 

Areas that come under the jurisdiction of Nayagaon P.S are:
 Mohammadchak
 Rasulpur
 Kasturi Chak-Paswan tola
 Chuturpur 
 Madrani Chak ghat
 Nayagaon
 Sitabganj 
 Dumri Buzurg

References

Villages in Saran district